The ozone monitoring instrument (OMI) is a nadir-viewing visual and ultraviolet spectrometer aboard the NASA Aura spacecraft. Aura  flies  in  formation  about  15  minutes  behind Aqua, both of which orbit the earth in a polar Sun-synchronous pattern. Aura was launched on July 15, 2004, and OMI has collected data since August 9, 2004. OMI can distinguish between aerosol types, such as smoke, dust, and sulfates, and can measure cloud pressure and coverage, which provide data to derive tropospheric ozone. OMI follows in the heritage of TOMS, SBUV, GOME, SCIAMACHY, and GOMOS. OMI measurements cover a spectral region of 264–504  nm (nanometers) with a spectral resolution between 0.42 nm and 0.63 nm and a nominal ground footprint of 13 × 24 km2 at  nadir. The Aura satellite orbits at an altitude of 705 km in a sun-synchronous polar orbit with an exact 16-day repeat cycle and wit h a local equator crossing time of 13. 45 ( 1:45 P.M.)  on  the ascending node. The orbital inclination is  98.1 degrees, providing latitudinal coverage from 82° N to 82° S. It is a wide-field-imaging spectrometer with a 114° across-track viewing angle range that provides a 2600 km wide swath, enabling measurements with a daily global coverage. OMI is continuing the TOMS record for total ozone and other atmospheric parameters related to ozone chemistry and climate.

The OMI project is a cooperation between the Netherlands Agency for Aerospace Programmes (NIVR), the Finnish Meteorological Institute (FMI) and the National Aeronautics and Space Agency (NASA).

The OMI project was carried out under the direction of the NIVR and financed by the Ministries of Economic Affairs, Transport and Public Works and the Ministry of Education and Science. The instrument was built by Dutch Space in co-operation with Netherlands Organisation for Applied Scientific Research Science and Industry and Netherlands Institute for Space Research. The Finnish industry supplied the electronics. The scientific part of the OMI project is managed by KNMI (principal investigator Prof. Dr. P. F. Levelt), in close co-operation with NASA and the Finnish Meteorological Institute.

References

External links
OMI webpage at NASA.gov
OMI webpage at KNMI.nl
Tropospheric Emission Monitoring Internet Service (TEMIS)
https://docserver.gesdisc.eosdis.nasa.gov/repository/Mission/OMI/3.3_ScienceDataProductDocumentation/3.3.2_ProductRequirements_Designs/README.OMI_DUG.pdf

Spectrometers
Ozone depletion
Weather imaging satellite sensors